Nicanor (Nīkā́nōr) of Epirus was a son of Myrton of Epirus, and lived in the 3rd to 2nd centuries BCE. Along with his father, he supported the oppressive and rapacious proceedings of Charops of Epirus in the government of their native country.

References

Sources

3rd-century BC births
2nd-century BC deaths
2nd-century BC Greek people
Ancient Epirotes